Dutch Fork High School is a school in the Lexington & Richland County School District Five, located in Irmo, South Carolina.

Notable alumni
 Tyler Bass, NFL kicker for the Buffalo Bills
Alaina Coates, professional women's basketball player
Murphy Holloway, professional basketball player
 Bryce Thompson, NFL defensive back
 Drew Williams, former NFL long snapper
 Dallas Wise, track and field Paralympian
Dustin Johnson, LIV Golf, Masters Champion

References

External links
 Dutch Fork High School

Public high schools in South Carolina
Schools in Lexington County, South Carolina
Education in Richland County, South Carolina
1992 establishments in South Carolina
Educational institutions established in 1992